P100 may refer to:

Automobiles 
 Borgward P100, a German sedan
 Ford P100, a car-based pickup truck
 SsangYong Musso Sports, a South Korean SUV
 Tesla Model S P100, an American sedan
 Tesla Model X P100, an American SUV

Aviation 
 Bellanca P-100 Airbus, an American passenger aircraft
 Pottier P.100, a French civil utility aircraft
 Rogožarski R-100, a Yugoslav fighter trainer

Science and medicine 
 Listeria virus P100, a bacteriophage
 Mannan-binding lectin-associated serine protease-2
 P100, a NIOSH air filtration rating
 P100, an event-related brain potential; see C1 and P1 (neuroscience)

Other uses 
 DSC-P100, a digital camera
 , a patrol boat of the Royal Australian Navy
 , a seaward defense boat of the Nigerian Navy
 Papyrus 100, a biblical manuscript
 Project P-100, a video game
 Tesla P100, a GPU accelerator
 P100, a state regional road in Latvia